James  Farrell (26 November 1803 – 26 April 1869) was the Dean of Adelaide from 1849 until 1866.

He was born in Longford, Ireland and educated at Trinity College, Dublin where he graduated M.A. He was ordained in 1826 and was a curate at Kilfree. After this he held incumbencies in Guernsey and Studley before becoming an SPG missionary in South Australia. On arrival in September 1840, he acted as assistant to Rev. C. B. Howard, the first Colonial Chaplain. He ministered at St John's Church, Adelaide from October 1841 to around July 1843, followed by Trinity Church in the same city.

In November 1845, Farrell married the widow of the Rev. C. B Howard (died 19 July 1843), whom he had succeeded as Colonial Chaplain. He died on 26 April 1869 at Malvern, while on a visit to England, and the office of Colonial Chaplain expired with him. He left four scholarships of £50 each to St. Peter's Collegiate School, Adelaide; and a window was erected to his memory in Trinity Church, of which he had been incumbent as well as dean.

The Mid North town of Farrell Flat is named in his honour.

References

1803 births
People from County Longford
Alumni of Trinity College Dublin
Deans of Adelaide
1869 deaths